Khun Chae National Park is a national park in Chiang Rai Province, Thailand. This rugged park is home to high mountains and waterfalls.

Geography
The park's area is 168,750 rai ~ . The park adjoins two other national parks: Chae Son National Park and Mae Takhrai National Park.

Attractions

A giant ficus tree is located near the park headquarters.

See also
List of national parks of Thailand
List of Protected Areas Regional Offices of Thailand

Flora and fauna
The park features numerous forest types, depending on altitude, including bamboo forest, deciduous dipterocarp forest, pine forest, rainforest and evergreen forest.

Animal species include Asiatic black bear, Siamese hare, serow, barking deer, hog badger, slow loris, white-handed gibbon, leopard cat and wild boar. Reptiles include king cobra, geckos and skinks.

Avian life includes scarlet minivet, red junglefowl, shikra, ashy drongo, white-crowned forktail, brown fish owl, crested serpent eagle, velvet-fronted nuthatch, blue-throated barbet, coppersmith barbet and blue-winged leafbird.

References

National parks of Thailand
Geography of Chiang Rai province
Tourist attractions in Chiang Rai province
1995 establishments in Thailand
Protected areas established in 1995